Peter Hujar (October 11, 1934 – November 26, 1987) was an American photographer best known for his black-and-white portraits. He has been recognized posthumously as a major American photographer of the late-20th century. However, Hujar's work received only marginal public recognition during his lifetime.

Early life 
Hujar was born October 11, 1934 in Trenton, New Jersey to Rose Murphy, a waitress, who was abandoned by her husband during her pregnancy. He was raised by his Ukrainian grandparents on their farm, where he spoke only Ukrainian until he started school. He remained on the farm with his grandparents until his grandmother's death in 1946. He moved to New York City to live with his mother and her second husband. The household was abusive, and in 1950, when Hujar was 16, he left home and began to live independently.

Education 
Hujar received his first camera in 1947 and in 1953 entered the School of Industrial Art where he expressed interest in being a photographer. He encountered an encouraging teacher, the poet Daisy Aldan (1923–2001), and following her advice he became a commercial photography apprentice. Apart from classes in photography during high school, Hujar's photographic education and technical mastery was acquired in commercial photo studios. By 1957, when he was age 23 he was making photographs now considered to be of museum quality. Early in 1967, he was one of a select group of young photographers in a master class taught by Richard Avedon and Marvin Israel, where he met Alexey Brodovitch and Diane Arbus.

Artistic career 
In 1958, Hujar accompanied the artist Joseph Raffael on a Fulbright to Italy. In 1963, he secured his own Fulbright and returned to Italy with Paul Thek, where they explored and photographed the Capuchin Catacombs of Palermo, classic images featured in his 1975 book Portraits in Life and Death. In 1964, Hujar returned to America and became a chief assistant in the studio of the commercial photographer Harold Krieger. Around this time, he met Andy Warhol, posed for four of Warhol's three-minute Screen Tests and was included in the compilation film The Thirteen Most Beautiful Boys that was assembled from Screen Tests.

In 1967, Hujar quit his job in commercial photography, and at great financial sacrifice, began to pursue primarily his own art work that reflected his homosexual milieu. He was an influential artist-activist of the gay liberation movement; In 1969, with his lover, the political activist Jim Fouratt, he witnessed the Stonewall riots in the West Village. Also at the urging of Fouratt, he took the now somewhat ironic photo "Come out!!" for the Gay Liberation Front, or GLF, but it was the extent of his involvement with the group.  In 1973, he moved into a loft above The Eden Theater at 189 2nd Avenue in the East Village, where he lived for the rest of his life.

In the late-1970s and early-1980s he frequented the bohemian art world of Downtown Manhattan, shooting portraits of the artists there such as drag queen actor Divine and writers, such as Susan Sontag, William Burroughs, Fran Lebowitz, and Vince Aletti. He visited "extremely serious, very heavy S&M bars" and the abandoned West Side Hudson River piers where men cruised for sex.
In 1975, Hujar published Portraits in Life and Death, with an introduction by Sontag. After a tepid reception, the book became a classic in American photography. The rest of the 1970s was a period of prolific work. In early 1981, Hujar met the writer, filmmaker, and artist David Wojnarowicz, and after a brief period as Hujar's lover, Wojnarowicz became a protégé linked to Hujar for the remainder of the photographer's life. Hujar remained instrumental in all phases of Wojnarowicz's emergence as an important young artist.

Another artist closely linked with Hujar is Robert Mapplethorpe. Both artists were gay, white men who excelled at portrait photography and made unashamedly homoerotic work that walked the line between pornography and fine art, but they were structural opposites. If Mapplethorpe reduced his subjects to abstract forms, his sitter’s faces to masks, his nude models to sculptures, then Hujar emphasized his sitters’ idiosyncrasies, their irreducible qualities, their human sentience over their fleshy geometry. "Orgasmic Man", one of Hujar’s more memorable works, is also a key difference between his work and Mapplethorpe’s; never once, in all of Mapplethorpe’s editioned photographs, did he show orgasm or ejaculation nor did he depict the concomitant facial expressions.

Hujar had a wide array of subjects in his photography, including cityscapes and urban still lifes, animals, nudes, abandoned buildings, and European ruins. His photography, which was mostly in black and white, has been described as conveying an intimacy, suggestive of both love and loss. One aspect of this intimate quality was Hujar's ability to connect with his sitters. One of his models was quoted after an unsuccessful session saying:

“We couldn’t ‘reveal.’ As an actor you have to reveal. And Hujar’s big thing was that you had to reveal. I know that now, but I didn’t know it at the time. In other words, blistering, blazing honesty directed towards the lens. No pissing about. No posing. No putting anything on. No camping around. Just flat, real who-you-are...You must strip down all the nonsense until you get to the bone. That’s what Peter wanted and that was his great, great talent and skill.”

Hujar's portraits, the subject of the first half of the one book he published while he was alive, are simple; he almost never used props and the focus of his work was on the sitter as opposed to the backdrop of the shot. Usually, his subjects either were sitting or psoing in a recumbent way.

Death from AIDS 
In January 1987, Hujar was diagnosed with AIDS. He died 10 months later at age 53 on November 25 at Cabrini Medical Center in New York.

His funeral was held at Church of St. Joseph in Greenwich Village, and he was buried at Gate of Heaven Cemetery in Valhalla, New York.

Hujar willed his estate to his friend Stephen Koch.

The first retrospective of Hujar's work came in 1994 in the Stedelijk Museum in Amsterdam in 1994.

Publications 
Portraits in Life and Death. New York City: Da Capo, 1976.
Peter Hujar. New York City: Grey Art Gallery & Study Center, New York University, 1990. With contributions by Stephen Koch and Thomas W Sokolowski.
Peter Hujar. Peter Hujar: A Retrospective. Zurich, Switzerland: Scalo, 1994. With contributions by Urs Stahel, Hripsimé Visser, and Max Kozloff.
Peter Hujar, Intimate Survey. Chicago, Illinois: Stephen Daiter Galery, 1999.
Peter Hujar: Animals and Nudes. Santa Fe, New Mexico: Twin Palms, 2002. With contributions by Klaus Kertess.
Peter Hujar: Night. New York: Matthew Marks Gallery; San Francisco, California: Fraenkel Gallery, 2005. With contributions by Bob Nickas.
Subterranean Monuments: Burckhardt, Johnson, Hujar. Poughkeepsie, New York: Frances Lehman Loeb Art Center, Vassar College, 2006.
Peter Hujar Photographs 1956-1958. New York City: Mathew Marks Gallery, 2009. With contributions by Stephen Koch.
Changing Difference: Queer Politics and Shifting Identities: Peter Hujar, Mark Morrisroe, Jack Smith. Milan, Italy: Silvana, 2013. With contributions by Lorenzo Fusi.
Peter Hujar: Love & Lust. Fraenkel Gallery, 2014.
Peter Hujar: Lost Downtown. Steidl, 2016. With contributions by Vince Aletti.
Speed of Life. Aperture Foundation; Fundación MAPFRE, Área De Cultura, 2017. . With essays by Philip Gefter, Joel Smith, and Steve Turtell and contributions by Martha Scott Burton.

Exhibitions 
1974: Peter Hujar, Floating Foundation of Photography, New York City
1977: Peter Hujar, Catskill Center for Photography, Woodstock, New York
1982: Peter Hujar, Forum Stadtpark, Graz; Galerie Modern Art, Vienna, Austria
1982: Peter Hujar, Frankfurter Kunstverein, Frankfurt, Germany Peter Hujar, Kunsthalle Basel, Basel, Switzerland
1988: The Photographs of Peter Hujar, Buffalo State College, Buffalo, New York
1994: Peter Hujar: A Retrospective, Stedelijk Museum Amsterdam, Netherlands; traveled to Fotomuseum Winterthur, Winterthur, Switzerland
1995: Peter Hujar. A Charm in Life and Death, Kunstmuseum Wolfsburg, Germany
2005: Peter Hujar, P.S.1 Contemporary Art Center, Long Island City, New York
2007: Peter Hujar, Institute of Contemporary Arts, London
2017–2019: Peter Hujar: Speed of Life, Fundación Mapfre, Barcelona, Spain, 2017; traveled to Fotomuseum den Hague, Den Haag, The Netherlands, 2017; Morgan Library & Museum, New York City; Berkeley Art Museum & Pacific Film Archive, Berkeley, CA; Wexner Center for the Arts, Columbus, OH; Galerie nationale du Jeu de Paume, Paris, 2019

Collections 
Hujar's work is held in the following collections:
Art Institute of Chicago
Carnegie Museum of Art
Fogg Museum, Harvard University
J. Paul Getty Museum
Morgan Library & Museum
Museum of Modern Art
Nelson-Atkins Museum of Art
San Francisco Museum of Modern Art
Stedelijk Museum Amsterdam
Tate, UK: 10 prints (as of May 2021)
Walker Art Center
Whitney Museum of American Art
Yale University Art Gallery

References

External links
Peter Hujar Archive
Morgan Library & Museum
artnet
Visual AIDS
Chritie's

1934 births
1987 deaths
American gay artists
American LGBT photographers
LGBT people from New Jersey
AIDS-related deaths in New York (state)
Burials at Gate of Heaven Cemetery (Hawthorne, New York)
American people of Ukrainian descent
Artists from Trenton, New Jersey
20th-century American photographers
High School of Art and Design alumni
20th-century American LGBT people
Photographers from New Jersey